The Mountain Calls (German: Der Berg ruft) is a film directed by Luis Trenker which recreates the struggle between Edward Whymper and Jean-Antoine Carrel for the first successful ascent of the Matterhorn in 1865.

This German film is one of two 1938 Trenker remakes of Struggle for the Matterhorn in which Trenker acted in 1928, the other being the British The Challenge.

Plot
The Italian mountaineer Jean-Antoine Carrel wants to be the first man to reach the summit of the Matterhorn. He meets the British mountaineer Whymper and they decide to climb together. But due to an intrigue this agreement is dropped and the two men try it on the same day with two different teams, Carrel on the Italian side and Whymper on the Swiss side. The latter will successfully reach the summit along with his six companions, Hudson, Hadow, Douglas and the guides Croz and Taugwalder father and son. Only Whymper and the guides Taugwalder will survive the descent.

Cast
Luis Trenker as Jean Antoine Carrel 
Herbert Dirmoser as Edward Whymper 
Heidemarie Hatheyer as Felicitas 
Peter Elsholtz as Giordano 
Lucie Höflich as Mother Carell 
Blandine Ebinger as Miss Sweaton 
Umberto Sacripante as Luc Meynet 
Reginald Pasch as Hudson 
Robert Thiem as Hadow 
Kunibert Gensichen as Douglas 
Luis Gerold as  Guide Croz 
Friedrich Ulmer as Favre 
Bruno Hübner as Stefano 
Armin Schweizer as Seiler 
Lotte Spira as Frau Seiler

See also
The Challenge (1938)
First ascent of the Matterhorn

External links
 (subtitles in French)

1938 films
1930s adventure drama films
1930s historical films
German adventure drama films
German historical films
Films of Nazi Germany
British drama films
Films set in Switzerland
Films set in Italy
Films set in the Alps
Films set in the 1860s
Mountaineering films
Matterhorn
German multilingual films
Remakes of German films
Sound film remakes of silent films
German black-and-white films
1938 multilingual films
1938 drama films
1930s British films
1930s German films